A Hopfield network  (or Ising model of a neural network or Ising–Lenz–Little model) is a form of recurrent artificial neural network and a type of spin glass system popularised by John Hopfield in 1982 as described earlier by Little in 1974 based on Ernst Ising's work with Wilhelm Lenz on the Ising model. Hopfield networks serve as content-addressable ("associative") memory systems with binary threshold nodes, or with continuous variables. Hopfield networks also provide a model for understanding human memory.

Origins 
The Ising model of a neural network as a memory model was first proposed by William A. Little in 1974, which was acknowledged by Hopfield in his 1982 paper. Networks with continuous dynamics were developed by Hopfield in his 1984 paper. A major advance in memory storage capacity was developed by Krotov and Hopfield in 2016 through a change in network dynamics and energy function. This idea was further extended by Demircigil and collaborators in 2017. The continuous dynamics of large memory capacity models was developed in a series of papers between 2016 and 2020. Large memory storage capacity Hopfield Networks are now called Dense Associative Memories or modern Hopfield networks.

Structure

The units in Hopfield nets are binary threshold units, i.e. the units only take on two different values for their states, and the value is determined by whether or not the unit's input exceeds its threshold . Discrete Hopfield nets describe relationships between binary (firing or not-firing) neurons .  At a certain time, the state of the neural net is described by a vector , which records which neurons are firing in a binary word of  bits.

The interactions  between neurons have units that usually take on values of 1 or −1, and this convention will be used throughout this article. However, other literature might use units that take values of 0 and 1.  These interactions are "learned" via Hebb's law of association, such that, for a certain state  

but .

Once the network is trained,  no longer evolve.  If a new state of neurons  is introduced to the neural network, the net acts on neurons such that

  if 
  if 

where  is the threshold value of the i'th neuron (often taken to be 0). In this way, Hopfield networks have the ability to "remember" states stored in the interaction matrix, because if a new state  is subjected to the interaction matrix, each neuron will change until it matches the original state  (see the Updates section below).

The connections in a Hopfield net typically have the following restrictions:
  (no unit has a connection with itself)
  (connections are symmetric)

The constraint that weights are symmetric guarantees that the energy function decreases monotonically while following the activation rules. A network with asymmetric weights may exhibit some periodic or chaotic behaviour; however, Hopfield found that this behavior is confined to relatively small parts of the phase space and does not impair the network's ability to act as a content-addressable associative memory system.

Hopfield also modeled neural nets for continuous values, in which the electric output of each neuron is not binary but some value between 0 and 1.  He found that this type of network was also able to store and reproduce memorized states.

Notice that every pair of units i and j in a Hopfield network has a connection that is described by the connectivity weight .

Updating

Updating one unit (node in the graph simulating the artificial neuron) in the Hopfield network is performed using the following rule:

where:
  is the strength of the connection weight from unit j to unit i (the weight of the connection).
  is the state of unit i.
  is the threshold of unit i.

Updates in the Hopfield network can be performed in two different ways:
 Asynchronous: Only one unit is updated at a time. This unit can be picked at random, or a pre-defined order can be imposed from the very beginning.
 Synchronous: All units are updated at the same time. This requires a central clock to the system in order to maintain synchronization. This method is viewed by some as less realistic, based on an absence of observed global clock influencing analogous biological or physical systems of interest.

Neurons "attract or repel each other" in state space 
The weight between two units has a powerful impact upon the values of the neurons. Consider the connection weight  between two neurons i and j. If , the updating rule implies that:
 when , the contribution of j in the weighted sum is positive. Thus,  is pulled by j towards its value 
 when , the contribution of j in the weighted sum is negative. Then again,  is pushed by j towards its value 

Thus, the values of neurons i and j will converge if the weight between them is positive. Similarly, they will diverge if the weight is negative.

Working principles of discrete and continuous Hopfield networks  

Bruck shed light on the behavior of a neuron in the discrete Hopfield network when proving its convergence in his paper in 1990.  A subsequent paper further investigated the behavior of any neuron in both discrete-time and continuous-time Hopfield networks when the corresponding energy function is minimized during an optimization process.  Bruck shows that neuron j changes its state if and only if it further decreases the following biased pseudo-cut.  The discrete Hopfield network minimizes the following biased pseudo-cut for the synaptic weight matrix of the Hopfield net.

where  and  represents the set of neurons which are −1 and +1, respectively, at time .  For further details, see the recent paper.

The discrete-time Hopfield Network always minimizes exactly the following pseudo-cut

 

The continuous-time Hopfield network always minimizes an upper bound to the following weighted cut

 

where  is a zero-centered sigmoid function.

The complex Hopfield network, on the other hand, generally tends to minimize the so-called shadow-cut of the complex weight matrix of the net.

Energy

Hopfield nets have a scalar value associated with each state of the network, referred to as the "energy", E, of the network, where:

This quantity is called "energy" because it either decreases or stays the same upon network units being updated. Furthermore, under repeated updating the network will eventually converge to a state which is a local minimum in the energy function (which is considered to be a Lyapunov function). Thus, if a state is a local minimum in the energy function it is a stable state for the network. Note that this energy function belongs to a general class of models in physics under the name of Ising models; these in turn are a special case of Markov networks, since the associated probability measure, the Gibbs measure, has the Markov property.

Hopfield network in optimization 

Hopfield and Tank presented the Hopfield network application in solving the classical traveling-salesman problem in 1985. Since then, the Hopfield network has been widely used for optimization. The idea of using the Hopfield network in optimization problems is straightforward: If a constrained/unconstrained cost function can be written in the form of the Hopfield energy function E, then there exists a Hopfield network whose equilibrium points represent solutions to the constrained/unconstrained optimization problem.  Minimizing the Hopfield energy function both minimizes the objective function and satisfies the constraints also as the constraints are “embedded” into the synaptic weights of the network. Although including the optimization constraints into the synaptic weights in the best possible way is a challenging task, many difficult optimization problems with constraints in different disciplines have been converted to the Hopfield energy function: Associative memory systems, Analog-to-Digital conversion, job-shop scheduling problem, quadratic assignment and other related NP-complete problems, channel allocation problem in wireless networks, mobile ad-hoc network routing problem, image restoration, system identification, combinatorial optimization, etc, just to name a few. Further details can be found in e.g. the paper.

Initialization and running 

Initialization of the Hopfield networks is done by setting the values of the units to the desired start pattern. Repeated updates are then performed until the network converges to an attractor pattern.  Convergence is generally assured, as Hopfield proved that the attractors of this nonlinear dynamical system are stable, not periodic or chaotic as in some other systems.  Therefore, in the context of Hopfield networks, an attractor pattern is a final stable state, a pattern that cannot change any value within it under updating.

Training
Training a Hopfield net involves lowering the energy of states that the net should "remember". This allows the net to serve as a content addressable memory system, that is to say, the network will converge to a "remembered" state if it is given only part of the state. The net can be used to recover from a distorted input to the trained state that is most similar to that input. This is called associative memory because it recovers memories on the basis of similarity. For example, if we train a Hopfield net with five units so that the state (1, −1, 1, −1, 1) is an energy minimum, and we give the network the state (1, −1, −1, −1, 1) it will converge to (1, −1, 1, −1, 1). Thus, the network is properly trained when the energy of states which the network should remember are local minima. Note that, in contrast to Perceptron training, the thresholds of the neurons are never updated.

Learning rules
There are various different learning rules that can be used to store information in the memory of the Hopfield network. It is desirable for a learning rule to have both of the following two properties:
 Local: A learning rule is local if each weight is updated using information available to neurons on either side of the connection that is associated with that particular weight.
 Incremental: New patterns can be learned without using information from the old patterns that have been also used for training. That is, when a new pattern is used for training, the new values for the weights only depend on the old values and on the new pattern.

These properties are desirable, since a learning rule satisfying them is more biologically plausible. For example, since the human brain is always learning new concepts, one can reason that human learning is incremental. A learning system that was not incremental would generally be trained only once, with a huge batch of training data.

Hebbian learning rule for Hopfield networks
Hebbian theory was introduced by Donald Hebb in 1949 in order to explain "associative learning," in which simultaneous activation of neuron cells leads to pronounced increases in synaptic strength between those cells. It is often summarized as "Neurons that fire together, wire together. Neurons that fire out of sync, fail to link".

The Hebbian rule is both local and incremental. For the Hopfield networks, it is implemented in the following manner when learning 
binary patterns:

where  represents bit i from pattern .

If the bits corresponding to neurons i and j are equal in pattern , then the product   will be positive. This would, in turn, have a positive effect on the weight  and the values of i and j will tend to become equal. The opposite happens if the bits corresponding to neurons i and j are different.

Storkey learning rule
This rule was introduced by Amos Storkey in 1997 and is both local and incremental. Storkey also showed that a Hopfield network trained using this rule has a greater capacity than a corresponding network trained using the Hebbian rule. The weight matrix of an attractor neural network is said to follow the Storkey learning rule if it obeys:

where  is a form of local field at neuron i.
		    
This learning rule is local, since the synapses take into account only neurons at their sides. The rule makes use of more information from the patterns and weights than the generalized Hebbian rule, due to the effect of the local field.

Spurious patterns
Patterns that the network uses for training (called retrieval states) become attractors of the system. Repeated updates would eventually lead to convergence to one of the retrieval states. However, sometimes the network will converge to spurious patterns (different from the training patterns). The energy in these spurious patterns is also a local minimum. For each stored pattern x, the negation -x is also a spurious pattern.

A spurious state can also be a linear combination of an odd number of retrieval states. For example, when using 3 patterns , one can get the following spurious state:

Spurious patterns that have an even number of states cannot exist, since they might sum up to zero

Capacity

The Network capacity of the Hopfield network model is determined by neuron amounts and connections within a given network. Therefore, the number of memories that are able to be stored is dependent on neurons and connections. Furthermore, it was shown that the recall accuracy between vectors and nodes was 0.138 (approximately 138 vectors can be recalled from storage for every 1000 nodes) (Hertz et al., 1991). Therefore, it is evident that many mistakes will occur if one tries to store a large number of vectors. When the Hopfield model does not recall the right pattern, it is possible that an intrusion has taken place, since semantically related items tend to confuse the individual, and recollection of the wrong pattern occurs. Therefore, the Hopfield network model is shown to confuse one stored item with that of another upon retrieval. Perfect recalls and high capacity, >0.14, can be loaded in the network by Storkey learning method; ETAM, ETAM experiments also in. Ulterior models inspired by the Hopfield network were later devised to raise the storage limit and reduce the retrieval error rate, with some being capable of one-shot learning.

The storage capacity can be given as  where  is the number of neurons in the net.

Human memory
The Hopfield model accounts for associative memory through the incorporation of memory vectors. Memory vectors can be slightly used, and this would spark the retrieval of the most similar vector in the network. However, we will find out that due to this process, intrusions can occur. In associative memory for the Hopfield network, there are two types of operations: auto-association and hetero-association. The first being when a vector is associated with itself, and the latter being when two different vectors are associated in storage. Furthermore, both types of operations are possible to store within a single memory matrix, but only if that given representation matrix is not one or the other of the operations, but rather the combination (auto-associative and hetero-associative) of the two. It is important to note that Hopfield's network model utilizes the same learning rule as Hebb's (1949) learning rule, which basically tried to show that learning occurs as a result of the strengthening of the weights by when activity is occurring.

Rizzuto and Kahana (2001) were able to show that the neural network model can account for repetition on recall accuracy by incorporating a probabilistic-learning algorithm. During the retrieval process, no learning occurs. As a result, the weights of the network remain fixed, showing that the model is able to switch from a learning stage to a recall stage. By adding contextual drift they were able to show the rapid forgetting that occurs in a Hopfield model during a cued-recall task. The entire network contributes to the change in the activation of any single node.

McCulloch and Pitts' (1943) dynamical rule, which describes the behavior of neurons, does so in a way that shows how the activations of multiple neurons map onto the activation of a new neuron's firing rate, and how the weights of the neurons strengthen the synaptic connections between the new activated neuron (and those that activated it). Hopfield would use McCulloch–Pitts's dynamical rule in order to show how retrieval is possible in the Hopfield network. However, it is important to note that Hopfield would do so in a repetitious fashion. Hopfield would use a nonlinear activation function, instead of using a linear function. This would therefore create the Hopfield dynamical rule and with this, Hopfield was able to show that with the nonlinear activation function, the dynamical rule will always modify the values of the state vector in the direction of one of the stored patterns.

Dense associative memory or modern Hopfield network 
Hopfield networks are recurrent neural networks with dynamical trajectories converging to fixed point attractor states and described by an energy function. The state of each model neuron  is defined by a time-dependent variable , which can be chosen to be either discrete or continuous. A complete model describes the mathematics of how the future state of activity of each neuron depends on the known present or previous activity of all the neurons.

While having many desirable properties of associative memory, both of  these classical systems suffer from a small memory storage capacity, which scales linearly with the number of input features.

Dense Associative Memories (also known as the modern Hopfield networks) are generalizations of the classical Hopfield Networks that break the linear scaling relationship between the number of input features and the number of stored memories. This is achieved by introducing stronger non-linearities (either in the energy function or neurons’ activation functions) leading to super-linear (even an exponential) memory storage capacity as a function of the number of feature neurons. The network still requires a sufficient number of hidden neurons.

The key theoretical idea behind the modern Hopfield networks is to use an energy function and an update rule that is more sharply peaked around the stored memories in the space of neuron’s configurations compared to the classical Hopfield Network.

Discrete variables 
A simple example of the modern Hopfield network can be written in terms of binary variables  that represent the active  and inactive  state of the model neuron .In this formula the weights  represent the matrix of memory vectors (index  enumerates different memories, and index  enumerates the content of each memory corresponding to the -th feature neuron), and the function  is a rapidly growing non-linear function. The update rule for individual neurons (in the asynchronous case) can be written in the following form which states that in order to calculate the updated state of the -th neuron the network compares two energies: the energy of the network with the -th neuron in the ON state and the energy of the network with the -th neuron in the OFF state, given the states of the remaining neuron. The updated state of the -th neuron selects the state that has the lowest of the two energies.

In the limiting case when the non-linear energy function is quadratic  these equations reduce to the familiar energy function and the update rule for the classical binary Hopfield Network.

The memory storage capacity of these networks can be calculated for random binary patterns. For the power energy function  the maximal number of memories that can be stored and retrieved from this network without errors is given byFor an exponential energy function  the memory storage capacity is exponential in the number of feature neurons

Continuous variables 
Modern Hopfield networks or dense associative memories can be best understood in continuous variables and continuous time. There are no synaptic connections among the feature neurons or the memory neurons. A matrix  denotes the strength of synapses from a feature neuron  to the memory neuron . The synapses are assumed to be symmetric, so that the same value characterizes a different physical synapse from the memory neuron  to the feature neuron . It is convenient to define these activation functions as derivatives of the Lagrangian functions for the two groups of neuronsThis way the specific form of the equations for neuron's states is completely defined once the Lagrangian functions are specified.

General systems of non-linear differential equations can have many complicated behaviors that can depend on the choice of the non-linearities and the initial conditions. For Hopfield Networks, however, this is not the case - the dynamical trajectories always converge to a fixed point attractor state. This property is achieved because these equations are specifically engineered so that they have an underlying energy function The terms grouped into square brackets represent a Legendre transform of the Lagrangian function with respect to the states of the neurons. If the Hessian matrices of the Lagrangian functions are positive semi-definite, the energy function is guaranteed to decrease on the dynamical trajectory  This property makes it possible to prove that the system of dynamical equations describing temporal evolution of neurons' activities will eventually reach a fixed point attractor state.

In certain situations one can assume that the dynamics of hidden neurons equilibrates at a much faster time scale compared to the feature neurons, . In this case the steady state solution of the second equation in the system can be used to express the currents of the hidden units through the outputs of the feature neurons. This makes it possible to reduce the general theory to an effective theory for feature neurons only. The resulting effective update rules and the energies for various common choices of the Lagrangian functions are shown in Fig.2. In the case of log-sum-exponential Lagrangian function the update rule (if applied once) for the states of the feature neurons is the attention mechanism commonly used in many modern AI systems (see Ref. for the derivation of this result from the continuous time formulation).

Relationship to classical Hopfield network with continuous variables 
Classical formulation of continuous Hopfield Networks can be understood as a special limiting case of the modern Hopfield networks with one hidden layer. In equation it is a Legendre transform of the Lagrangian for the feature neurons, while in  the third term is an integral of the inverse activation function. Nevertheless, these two expressions are in fact equivalent, since the derivatives of a function and its Legendre transform are inverse functions of each other. Thus, the two expressions are equal up to an additive constant. This completes the proof that the classical Hopfield Network with continuous states is a special limiting case of the modern Hopfield network with energy.

General formulation of the modern Hopfield network 

Biological neural networks have a large degree of heterogeneity in terms of different cell types. This section describes a mathematical model of a fully connected modern Hopfield network assuming the extreme degree of heterogeneity: every single neuron is different. Specifically, an energy function and the corresponding dynamical equations are described assuming that each neuron has its own activation function and kinetic time scale.  The network is assumed to be fully connected, so that every neuron is connected to every other neuron using a symmetric matrix of weights , indices  and  enumerate different neurons in the network, see Fig.3. The easiest way to mathematically formulate this problem is to define the architecture through a Lagrangian function  that depends on the activities of all the neurons in the network. In the simplest case, when the Lagrangian is additive for different neurons, this definition results in the activation that is a non-linear function of that neuron's activity. For non-additive Lagrangians this activation function can depend on the activities of a group of neurons. For instance, it can contain contrastive (softmax) or divisive normalization. The dynamical equations describing temporal evolution of a given neuron are given by  This equation belongs to the class of models called firing rate models in neuroscience. Each neuron  collects the axonal outputs  from all the neurons, weights them with the synaptic coefficients  and produces its own time-dependent activity . The temporal evolution has a time constant , which in general can be different for every neuron. This network has a global energy function  where the first two terms represent the Legendre transform of the Lagrangian function with respect to the neurons' currents . The temporal derivative of this energy function can be computed on the dynamical trajectories leading to (see   for details)  The last inequality sign holds provided that the matrix  (or its symmetric part) is positive semi-definite. If, in addition to this, the energy function is bounded from below the non-linear dynamical equations are guaranteed to converge to a fixed point attractor state. The advantage of formulating this network in terms of the Lagrangian functions is that it makes it possible to easily experiment with different choices of the activation functions and different architectural arrangements of neurons. For all those flexible choices the conditions of convergence are determined by the properties of the matrix  and the existence of the lower bound on the energy function.

Hierarchical associative memory network 
The neurons can be organized in layers so that every neuron in a given layer has the same activation function and the same dynamic time scale. If we assume that there are no horizontal connections between the neurons within the layer (lateral connections) and there are no skip-layer connections, the general fully connected network, reduces to the architecture shown in Fig.4. It has  layers of recurrently connected neurons with the states described by continuous variables  and the activation functions , index  enumerates the layers of the network, and index  enumerates individual neurons in that layer. The activation functions can depend on the activities of all the neurons in the layer. Every layer can have a different number of neurons . These neurons are recurrently connected with the neurons in the preceding and the subsequent layers. The feedforward weights and the feedback weights are equal. These top-down signals help neurons in lower layers to decide on their response to the presented stimuli. Following the general recipe it is convenient to introduce a Lagrangian function  for the -th hidden layer, which depends on the activities of all the neurons in that layer. The activation functions in that layer can be defined as partial derivatives of the Lagrangian  With these definitions the energy (Lyapunov) function is given by  If the Lagrangian functions, or equivalently the activation functions, are chosen in such a way that the Hessians for each layer are positive semi-definite and the overall energy is bounded from below, this system is guaranteed to converge to a fixed point attractor state. The temporal derivative of this energy function is given by  Thus, the hierarchical layered network is indeed an attractor network with the global energy function. This network is described by a hierarchical set of synaptic weights that can be learned for each specific problem.

See also
 Associative memory (disambiguation)
 Autoassociative memory
 Boltzmann machine – like a Hopfield net but uses annealed Gibbs sampling instead of gradient descent
 Dynamical systems model of cognition
 Ising model
 Hebbian theory

References

External links 

 
Hopfield Network Javascript
The Travelling Salesman Problem – Hopfield Neural Network JAVA Applet

Neural Lab Graphical Interface – Hopfield Neural Network graphical interface (Python & gtk)

Neural network architectures